The School of Informatics is an academic unit of the University of Edinburgh, in Scotland, responsible for research, teaching, outreach and commercialisation in informatics. It was created in 1998 from the former Department of Artificial Intelligence, the Centre for Cognitive Science and the Department of Computer Science, along with the Artificial Intelligence Applications Institute (AIAI) and the Human Communication Research Centre.

Research in the School of Informatics draws on multiple disciplines. The school is particularly known for research in the areas of artificial intelligence, computational linguistics, systems biology, mathematical logic and theoretical computer science; but also contributes to many other areas of informatics.

The School of Informatics was ranked 12th in the world by the QS World University Rankings 2014. As of 2022, the school is ranked 1st in the UK according to CSRankings, 1st in the UK in the latest 2021 Research Excellence Framework (REF) by research power, and 1st in the world for natural language processing (NLP).

Research 

The School of Informatics was awarded a 5*A in the UK HEFCE's 2001 RAE, the only computer science department in the country to achieve this highest possible rating.  In the 2008 RAE, the School's "Quality Profile" was 35/50/15/0/0, which means that of the over 100 Full-time equivalent (FTE) staff research outputs evaluated, 35% were found "world-leading (4*)" and 50% "internationally excellent (3*)".  These figures can be interpreted in a number of ways, but place the School first by volume and tied for second (following Cambridge with 45/45/10/0/0) by percentage of research rated 3* or 4*.  The School is generally considered world-leading, standing with the foremost U.S. institutes, particularly in areas such as artificial intelligence, natural language processing and machine translation, and theoretical computer science.

The School has a number of research Institutes:

Institute for Adaptive and Neural Computation: ANC
ANC investigates theoretical and empirical study of brain processes and artificial learning systems, drawing on neuroscience, cognitive science, computer science, computational science, mathematics and statistics.

Artificial Intelligence and its Applications Institute: AIAI 
Previously known as CISA (Centre for Intelligent Systems and their Applications), the Artificial Intelligence and its Applications Institute (AIAI) works on the foundations of artificial intelligence and autonomous systems, and their application to real-world problems.

Institute for Language, Cognition, and Computation: ILCC
ILCC performs research on all aspects of natural language processing, drawing on machine learning, statistical modeling, and computational, psychological, and linguistic theories of communication among humans and between humans and machines using text, speech and other modalities.

Institute for Computing Systems Architecture: ICSA
ICSA performs research on architecture and engineering of future computing systems: performance and scalability; innovative algorithms, architectures, compilers, languages and protocols.

Institute of Perception, Action and Behaviour: IPAB
IPAB links computational action, perception, representation, transformation and generation processes to real or virtual worlds: statistical machine learning, computer vision, mobile and humanoid robotics, motor control, graphics and visualization.

Laboratory for Foundations of Computer Science: LFCS

The LFCS Develops and applies foundational understanding of computation and communication: formal models, mathematical theories, and software tools.

Senior academic staff and alumni

Current 
Senior academic staff include:
 Malcolm Atkinson 
 Alan Bundy   
 Peter Buneman  
 Christopher Bishop 
 Rod Burstall , emeritus
 Kousha Etessami
 Wenfei Fan  
 Michael Fourman 
 Igor Goryanin
 Dragan Gasevic
 Jane Hillston 
 Aggelos Kiayias 
 Elham Kashefi
 Frank Keller
 Mirella Lapata  
 Leonid Libkin  
 Ursula Martin 
 Johanna Moore 
 Michael O'Boyle
 Gordon Plotkin  
 Don Sannella 
 Mark Steedman   
 Keith Stenning
 Amos Storkey
 Austin Tate  
 Sethu Vijayakumar 
 Philip Wadler  
 Barbara Webb
 Bonnie Webber

Former 
 Donald Michie , founder of Artificial Intelligence in the UK
 Sidney Michaelson , foundation chair of the former computer science department.
 Jon Oberlander

Notable alumni
Alumni of the school of informatics include:
 Samson Abramsky  , computer scientist at the University of Oxford
 Pat Ambler, creator of Freddy II
 Joe Armstrong, creator of Erlang programming language and Open Telecom Platform (OTP)
 Andrew Blake , computer scientist and former director of Microsoft Research, Cambridge and Alan Turing Institute in London
 Bob Boyer , computer scientist, mathematician, philosopher at the University of Texas at Austin
 Alan W. Black, Professor at the Language Technologies Institute, Carnegie Mellon University
 Justine Cassell  , Professor at the Human–Computer Interaction Institute, Carnegie Mellon University
 Luca Cardelli  , computer scientist, Assistant Director of Microsoft Research, Cambridge
 Ian Clarke, creator of Freenet
 Rosemary Candlin, crystallographer and computer scientist at CERN
 Margarita Chli, Leader of the Vision for Robotics Lab at ETH Zürich
 John Darlington, Emeritus Professor, Imperial College London
 Bruce Davie, CTO of VMware
 Peter Dayan , director at the Max Planck Institute for Biological Cybernetics in Tübingen, Germany
 Paul Dourish , Professor at the University of California, Irvine
 Carla Gomes  , computer scientist, Founding Director of the Cornell University Institute for Computational Sustainability
 Leslie Ann Goldberg , computer scientist at the University of Oxford
 Jeremy Gibbons, Professor of computing, University of Oxford
 Andrew Gordon at Microsoft Research
 Michael J. C. Gordon  (1948–2017), computer scientist at the University of Cambridge
 Doug Gurr, global vice-president and head of Amazon UK
 Philippa Gardner , Professor of Theoretical Computer Science at Imperial College London
 Richard Gregory  (1923–2010), cognitive scientist at the University of Bristol
 Pat Hayes , Senior Research Scientist at the Institute for Human and Machine Cognition in Pensacola, Florida
 Robert Harper (computer scientist) , Professor of computer science at Carnegie Mellon University
 Matthew Hennessy , Co-creator of Hennessy–Milner logic
 Geoffrey Hinton  , computer scientist at Google Brain and winner of the Turing Award.
 Xuedong Huang , CTO of Microsoft Azure AI
 Auke Ijspeert, Head of the Biorobotics Laboratory at EPFL
 Mark H. Johnson , cognitive neuroscientist and Brain–computer interface researcher, Head of the Department of Psychology at the University of Cambridge
 Mark Jerrum, Professor of Pure mathematics at the University of London, Gödel Prize Laureate
 Philipp Koehn, Professor of Machine Translation at Johns Hopkins University
 Robert Kowalski  , logician whose interpretation of the Horn clause at Edinburgh became instrumental in the creation of Prolog
 Lǐ Wèi, mathematician and computer scientist, President of Beihang University
 Christopher Longuet-Higgins (1923–2004) , cognitive scientist
 Robin Milner   (1934–2010), computer scientist, winner of the Turing Award
 Eugenio Moggi, first to explicitly link the Monad of category theory to functional programming
 J Strother Moore   , computer scientist at the University of Texas at Austin
 Stephen Muggleton  , Head of the Computational Bioinformatics Laboratory at Imperial College London
 Alan Mycroft, Professor at the Computer Laboratory, University of Cambridge
 Timothy O'Shea , Emeritus Professor and former principal and vice-chancellor of the University of Edinburgh
 Robin Popplestone  (1938–2004), creator of COWSEL and POP-2
 Martha Palmer , creator of PropBank and VerbNet
 Benjamin C. Pierce, Henry Salvatori Professor of computer science at the University of Pennsylvania
 Lars Rasmussen (Software Developer), Co-Founder of Google Maps, Former Director of Engineering (CTO) of Facebook London.
 John C. Reynolds (1935–2013) , inventor of System F and professor of computer science at Carnegie Mellon University
 Davide Sangiorgi , Professor at the University of Bologna
 Nigel Shadbolt , Chairman of the Open Data Institute (ODI) and master of Jesus College, Oxford
 Alistair Sinclair, Professor at University of California, Berkeley, Gödel Prize Laureate
 Aaron Sloman , philosopher, cognitive scientist at the University of Birmingham
 Chris Tofts, scientist at Hewlett-Packard
 Mads Tofte, professor at the IT University of Copenhagen
 Leslie Valiant  , winner of the Turing Award in 2010 and Professor at Harvard University
 Lincoln Wallen, CTO of Improbable, former CTO of DreamWorks Animation
 Toby Walsh  , Professor of artificial intelligence at the UNSW
 Hanna Wallach at Microsoft Research
 David H. D. Warren, creator of the Warren Abstract Machine
 Andrew Zisserman , computer scientist at Google DeepMind and University of Oxford

Accommodation 

The 2002 Cowgate fire destroyed a number of buildings, including 80 South Bridge, which housed around a quarter of the school and its renowned AI library. By January 2003, space was made available in the University's Appleton Tower as a replacement.

Until June 2008, the School was dispersed over five sites: three in the George Square Campus: Appleton Tower, Buccleuch Place, Forrest Hill; and two at King's Buildings: James Clerk Maxwell Building, and the Darwin Building.

In June and July 2008, the School's research moved into its new home, the Informatics Forum. The building, designed by Bennetts Associates, Reaich and Hall and Buro Happold, now houses some 500 researchers, including staff and graduate students. Construction began in October 2005, and the Forum's completion in July 2008 finally brought the School's researchers together, under one roof, some ten years after its inception.

In August 2018, the School gained another research space in the form of the Bayes Centre, a purpose-built data science and Artificial Intelligence hub shared with multiple other data science and informatics groups, as well as the University's Maxwell Graduate Institute, encompassing the PhD research output of the mathematics departments at both Edinburgh and Heriot-Watt University.

See also
 Edinburgh Parallel Computing Centre
 ML
 Prolog
 Li-Fi
 WxWidgets
 Moses
 Hope
 NPL
 Freddy II
 Festival Speech Synthesis System
 LCF
 Edinburgh Multiple Access System
 Edinburgh IMP
 QCDOC
 Symbolic artificial intelligence
 Lighthill report

References 

 
Computer science departments in the United Kingdom
Educational institutions established in 1998
Schools of informatics
Informatics
1998 establishments in Scotland